uMkhonto we Sizwe (meaning  "Spear of the Nation"; abbreviated MK) was the paramilitary wing of the African National Congress (ANC), and was founded by Nelson Mandela in the wake of the Sharpeville massacre. Its mission was to fight against the South African government.

After warning the South African government in June 1961 of its intent to resist further acts of government-instituted terror if the government did not take steps toward constitutional reform and increase political rights, uMkhonto we Sizwe launched its first attacks against government installations on 16 December 1961. It was subsequently classified as a terrorist organisation by the South African government, and banned.

For a time it was headquartered in Rivonia, then rural but now an affluent suburb of Johannesburg. On 11 July 1963, 19 ANC and uMkhonto we Sizwe leaders, including Arthur Goldreich and Walter Sisulu, were arrested at Liliesleaf Farm, Rivonia. The farm was privately owned by Arthur Goldreich and bought with South African Communist Party and ANC funds, as non-whites were unable to own a property in that area under the Group Areas Act. This was followed by the Rivonia Trial, in which 10 leaders of the ANC were tried for 221 militant acts designed to "foment violent revolution". Wilton Mkwayi, chief of uMkhonto we Sizwe at the time, escaped during trial.

The organisation was formally disbanded in a ceremony at Orlando Stadium in Soweto, Gauteng, on 16 December 1993, although the armed struggle had been suspended earlier, during the negotiations to end apartheid.

Motivations for formation
According to Nelson Mandela, all of the founding members of the uMkhonto we Sizwe, including himself, were also members of the ANC. In his famous "I Am Prepared to Die" speech, Mandela outlined the motivations that led to the formation of uMkhonto we Sizwe:
At the beginning of June 1961, after a long and anxious assessment of the South African situation, I, and some colleagues, came to the conclusion that as violence in this country was inevitable, it would be unrealistic and wrong for African leaders to continue preaching peace and non-violence at a time when the government met our peaceful demands with force.

This conclusion was not easily arrived at. It was only when all else had failed, when all channels of peaceful protest had been barred to us, that the decision was made to embark on violent forms of political struggle, and to form uMkhonto we Sizwe. We did so not because we desired such a course, but solely because the government had left us with no other choice. In the Manifesto of uMkhonto published on 16 December 1961, which is exhibit AD, we said:
The time comes in the life of any nation when there remain only two choices – submit or fight. That time has now come to South Africa. We shall not submit and we have no choice but to hit back by all means in our power in defence of our people, our future, and our freedom.

Firstly, we believed that as a result of Government policy, violence by the African people had become inevitable, and that unless responsible leadership was given to canalise and control the feelings of our people, there would be outbreaks of terrorism which would produce an intensity of bitterness and hostility between the various races of this country which is not produced even by war. Secondly, we felt that without violence there would be no way open to the African people to succeed in their struggle against the principle of white supremacy. All lawful modes of expressing opposition to this principle had been closed by legislation, and we were placed in a position in which we had either to accept a permanent state of inferiority, or take over the Government. We chose to defy the law. We first broke the law in a way which avoided any recourse to violence; when this form was legislated against, and then the Government resorted to a show of force to crush opposition to its policies, only then did we decide to answer with violence.

The manifesto referred to by Mandela, adduced by the prosecution at his trial as Exhibit AD, included the statements: 
Our men are armed and trained freedom fighters not "terrorists".

We are fighting for democracy—majority rule—the right of the Africans to rule Africa.  We are fighting for a South Africa in which there will be peace and harmony and equal rights for all people.  We are not racialists, as the white oppressors are. The African National Congress has a message of freedom for all who live in our country.
The aim was to act only against hard targets such as power pylons and avoid any injury or loss of life.

Organizational Command Structure (1961–1964)
In the six or so months between making the decision to form the organisation (June) and the first acts of sabotage (December), the MK high command set up regional commands in the main centres. The people chosen to be part of these commands were chosen either because they had the necessary technical or military skills or because they were members of the Congress Alliance organisations.

Central (Overall) Command
Nelson Mandela
Walter Sisulu
Joe Slovo
Raymond Mhlaba (from 1962)
Wilton Mkwayi (from 1963)

Johannesburg (later Transvaal) Command
Jack Hodgson
Ahmed Kathrada
Denis Goldberg
Arthur Goldreich

Natal Command
Curnick Ndlovu
Ronnie Kasrils (from 1963)

Western Cape Command
Looksmart Ngudle
Fred Carneson

Eastern Cape Command
Vuyisile Mini

Border Command
Washington Bongco

Explosives Command
Jack Hodgson
Harold Strachan (from 1962)

Ex-Officio Commanders
Lambert Moloi (from 1964)
Joe Modise (from 1964)
Tom Sebina (from 1964)

Domestic campaign

1960s—1970s
In June 1961, Mandela sent a letter to South African newspapers warning the government that a campaign of sabotage would be launched unless the government agreed to call for a national constitutional convention. Beginning on 16 December 1961, the campaign by uMkhonto we Sizwe with Mandela as its leader, was launched, with bomb attacks on government targets and planned for possible guerrilla warfare. The first target of the campaign was an electricity sub-station. uMkhonto we Sizwe undertook other acts of sabotage in the next eighteen months. The government alleged more acts of sabotage had been carried out and at the Rivonia Trial the accused would be charged with 193 acts of sabotage in total. The sabotage included attacks on government posts, machines and power facilities, and crop burning.

Opinions in the ANC were divided on the viability of the ANC launching a military campaign and for this reason MK did not immediately publicly associate itself with the ANC. Initial attacks were "characterised by their simplicity": reflecting the Africans' lack of military training and the fact the whites had not seen service, in most cases, since the Second World War. The state responded with laws that allowed detention without trial and an unlimited power to ban organisations, and also by establishing military and civilian intelligence organisations.

In 1962, Mandela went to Algeria, Egypt and Ghana to get international backing for the group. After returning to South Africa, Joe Slovo reportedly complained that they had "sent [Mandela] off to Africa a Communist and he came back an African nationalist".

In December 1962, Looksmart Ngudle and Denis Goldberg helped to organise a training camp held at Mamre, outside Cape Town, later recognised as the first MK training centre inside South Africa; however it had to be abandoned early due to Security Police interest.

A lack of familiarity with the necessities of covert military work and the reliance on high-profile figures (such as Mandela) as leaders contributed to the South African state's ability to capture the organisation's leadership at their Rivonia headquarters outside Johannesburg at the end of 1962: effectively neutralisation of MK within South Africa for the next decade. However the organisation had established itself—and its key relationship as a disciplined part of the ANC—and did not disappear.

The early 1970s were a low point for the ANC in many ways, including in the military sphere. Attempts to rebuild uMkhonto we Sizwe inside South Africa resulted in many losses, although, as noted by the Military History Journal, some members, including Chris Hani, were able to remain undetected for a long period. Meanwhile, MK cadres had access to a growing range of military training opportunities in Algeria, Egypt and the Soviet Union and other communist-bloc countries.

The Soweto Uprising of 1976 led to a large exodus of young black men and women. Anxious to strike back at the apartheid regime, they crossed the border to Rhodesia to seek military training. While uMkhonto we Sizwe were able to rebuild an army—one capable of attacking prestigious targets such as the refineries at Sasolburg.

1980s: Bombings

1983: Church Street bombing
In 1983, the Church Street bomb was detonated in Pretoria near the Air Force headquarters, resulting in 19 deaths and 217 injuries.

1985: Amanzimtoti bombing
In the 1985 Amanzimtoti bombing on the Natal South Coast, five civilians were killed and 40 were injured when uMkhonto we Sizwe cadre Andrew Sibusiso Zondo detonated an explosive in a rubbish bin at a shopping centre shortly before Christmas. In a submission to the Truth and Reconciliation Commission (TRC), the ANC stated that Zondo's act, though "understandable" as a response to a recent South African Defence Force raid in Lesotho, was not in line with ANC policy. Zondo was executed in 1986.

1986: Durban beach-front bombing
In the 1986 Durban beach-front bombing, a bomb was detonated in a bar, killing three civilians and injuring 69. Robert McBride received the death penalty for this bombing, which became known as the "Magoo's Bar bombing". McBride received amnesty and became a senior police officer.

1987: Johannesburg bombings
In 1987, an explosion outside a Johannesburg court killed three police officers and injured a further 15; a court in Newcastle had been attacked in a similar way the previous year, injuring 24. Also in 1987, a bomb exploded at a military command centre in Johannesburg, killing one person and injuring 68 personnel.

Other bombings
The armed struggle continued with attacks on a series of soft targets, including a bank in Roodepoort in 1988, in which four civilians were killed and 18 injured. Also in 1988, a bomb outside a magistrate's court killed three. At the Ellis Park rugby stadium in Johannesburg, a car bomb killed two and injured 37 civilians. A multitude of bombs at restaurants and fast food outlets, including Wimpy Bars, and supermarkets occurred during the late 1980s, killing and wounding many people. Wimpy were specifically targeted because of their perceived rigid enforcements of many apartheid laws, including excluding non-whites from their restaurants.

1985—1987: Landmine campaign
From 1985 to 1987, there also was a campaign to place anti-tank mines on rural roads in what was then the Northern Transvaal. This tactic was abandoned due to the high rate of civilian casualties—especially among black labourers. The ANC estimated that there were 30 landmine explosions resulting in 23 deaths, while the government submitted a figure of 57 explosions resulting in 25 deaths.

Findings by the Truth and Reconciliation Commission
The Truth and Reconciliation Commission found that the use of torture by uMkhonto we Sizwe was "routine", as were executions "without due process" at ANC detention camps. This was particularly true in the period of 1979–1989, although torture was not official ANC policy. It called the Durban bombing a "gross violation of human rights".

The TRC also noted in its report that although "ANC had, in the course of the conflict, contravened the Geneva Protocols and was responsible for the commission of gross human rights violations…of the three main parties to the [South African] conflict, only the ANC committed itself to observing the tenets of the Geneva Protocols and, in the main, conducting the armed struggle in accordance within the international humanitarian law".

Foreign military activities

Angola
In January 1969, the ANC declared its solidarity with the People's Movement for the Liberation of Angola (MPLA) and pursued close military relations with that party, then involved in the Angolan War of Independence. Both movements were drawn into a practical and ideological friendship because of their shared links with the Soviet Union through the communist parties of their respective nations. At the First International Conference of Solidarity with the Fighting People of Southern Africa and the Portuguese Colonies, organised by the Afro-Asian People's Solidarity Organisation and the World Peace Council, the MPLA and ANC entered into a formal military alliance together with the South West African People's Organisation (SWAPO), the Zimbabwe African People's Union (ZAPU), and the African Party for the Independence of Guinea and Cape Verde (PAIGC). This became known as the Khartoum alliance.

The ANC-MPLA alliance assumed new significance in the mid-1970s with Angolan independence. After consolidating power with Cuban support, the MPLA granted MK permission to establish training facilities in Angola. The primary MK base in Angola was located at Novo Catengue, where intakes of up to 500 recruits were trained by Cuban military advisers. Between 1976 and 1979, over 1,000 MK guerrillas were trained at Novo Catengue. In recognition of Cuba's role in supervising the training programme, the third MK intake to muster out was named the "Moncada Detachment". There were also a number of smaller MK training camps established throughout Angola, namely at Quibaxe. Aside from Cuba, the Soviet Union also contributed some instructors at the request of Oliver Tambo; between 1976 and 1991, 200 Soviet military personnel served at various MK camps in Angola as training staff.

The ANC and MK presence in Angola re-ignited its alliance with SWAPO and its own armed wing, the People's Liberation Army of Namibia (PLAN). PLAN and MK frequently shared facilities in Angola and coordinated the transportation of supplies and war materiel.

In 1984, there was a series of mutinies in MK's Angolan camps that were suppressed by the Mbokodo, the ANC's internal security service. During this time, the ANC detained and executed a number of MK dissidents suspected of subversion or disloyalty. In one case mutineers killed ANC members and after the mutiny was suppressed seven mutineers were executed (with further executions only halted after the personal intervention of Oliver Tambo).

MK's presence in Angola inevitably embroiled it in the Angolan Civil War. In August 1983, an MK battalion was deployed against the National Union for the Total Independence of Angola (UNITA) insurgents near Kibashe. In 1986, three battalions of newly trained MK recruits were deployed to guard FAPLA rear areas during Operation Alpha Centauri. MK also participated in the Battle of Cuito Cuanavale, fighting against a joint South African and UNITA expeditionary force during Operation Hooper and Operation Packer. At least 100 MK cadres were killed during the Battle of Cuito Cuanavale, making that engagement of enormous symbolic importance, as it was the largest single loss of life in MK's history. Furthermore, MK's prestige inside South Africa was greatly enhanced by its participation in a conventional battle, and apparent willingness to directly confront a South African military force.

Rhodesia (Zimbabwe)
During the Rhodesian Bush War, MK was closely allied with the Zimbabwe People's Revolutionary Army (ZIPRA), the armed wing of ZAPU. MK became interested in using ZIPRA's infiltration routes to smuggle supplies to its fighters in South Africa, and organised a joint expedition with the latter in August 1967. A combined MK-ZIPRA force was largely eliminated by the Rhodesian Security Forces during Operation Nickel, and the survivors driven back across the border into Botswana and Zambia. Historian Rocky Williams assesses that MK and ZIPRA "fought well under difficult conditions" and that although the incursion failed, the Rhodesian authorities were forced to rely on clandestine military assistance from South Africa to counter them.

Concerning MK's alliance with ZIPRA, Oliver Tambo stated: "We have had close political relations with ZAPU, and these developed into relations at the military level, until we were in a position to fight together. This close alliance is the first of its kind one can recall in the liberation movement. In no previous instance has there actually been fighting by freedom fighters drawn from different territories."

In popular culture
In 1984, musician Prince Far I's album Umkhonto we Sizwe (Spear of the Nation) was released (posthumously) in an act of solidarity with the uMkhonto we Sizwe.
In 1987, a benefit hardcore compilation album Viva uMkhonto we Sizwe! was released on the Dutch label Konkurrel. It featured Scream, Challenger Crew, Morzelpronk, Social Unrest, The Ex, Depraved, Victims Family, B.G.K., Rhythm Pigs, Everything Falls Apart, Kafka Prosess, S.C.A.*, and 76% Uncertain.
Zimbabwean-born African-American author and filmmaker M. K. Asante Jr. embraced the initials M. K. after uMkhonto we Sizwe.
Dave Matthews Band song "#36" is dedicated to Chris Hani, the assassinated chief of staff of the uMkhonto we Sizwe and the leader of the South African Communist Party, and includes the refrain: "Hani, Hani, won't you dance with me?"

Notable members
In addition to co-founder Nelson Mandela, notable members include:

 Tatamkhulu Afrika
 Sipho Binda
 Anton Fransch
 Joe Gqabi
 Denis Goldberg
 Harry Gwala
 Chris Hani
 Samuel Hlongwane
 Ronnie Kasrils
 Moses Kotane 
 Tryphina Mboxela Jokweni
 Lennox Lagu
 Moses Mabhida
 Ashley Kriel
 Robert McBride
 Mac Maharaj
 Dikgope Madi
 Solomon Mahlangu
 Isaac Lesiba Maphotho
 Rudzani Maphwanya
 Jerry Masisi
 Vusumuzi Masondo
 Davidson Masuku
 Lawrence Mbatha
 Govan Mbeki
 Thabo Mbeki
 Duma Mdutyana 
 Raymond Mhlaba
 Wilton Mkwayi
 Joe Modise
 Thandi Modise
 Thabiso Mokhosi
 Lambert Moloi
 Alex Moumbaris
 Fabian Msimang
 Mavuso Msimang
 Refiloe Johannes Mudimu
 Phila Portia Ndwandwe
 Godfrey Ngwenya
 Wilson Nqose
 Siphiwe Nyanda
 Vejaynand Ramlakan
 Tom Sebina
 Aubrey Sedibe
 Solly Shoke
 Walter Sisulu
 Joe Slovo
 Marion Sparg
 Oliver Tambo
 Lindile Yam
 Tony Yengeni
 Andrew Zondo
 Jacob Zuma

Number of deaths
South African police statistics indicate that, in the period 1976 to 1986, approximately 130 people were killed by guerrillas. Of these, about thirty were members of various security forces and one hundred were civilians. Of the civilians, 40 were white and 60 black.
In turn, around 11+ ANC members were killed in cross-border raids by the SADF.

See also
Day of Reconciliation
Internal resistance to apartheid
South African Border War
Military history of South Africa
Necklacing

References

Further reading
Simon Stevens. 2019. "The Turn to Sabotage by the Congress Movement in South Africa." Past & Present.
Shubin, Vladimir (Institute for African Studies, Russian Academy of Sciences), "Unsung Heroes: The Soviet Military and the Liberation of Southern Africa", Cold War History, Vol. 7, No. 2, May 2007
The other armies: A brief historical overview of uMkhonto we Sizwehonto We Sizwe (uMkhonto we Sizwe), 1961–1994 – The South African Military History Society (Military History Journal, Vol. 11, No 5)
Shubin, Vladimir. Moscow and ANC: Three Decades of Co-operation and Beyond'
Rocky Williams, Rocky. Articles in the Journal of Security Sector Management'' and others

"The Question of Violence in Contemporary African Political Thought" – PDF document by Kwasi Wiredu

External links
Collection of uMkhonto we Sizwehonto we Sizwe documents – from anc.org, timeline and manifesto.

 
1961 establishments in South Africa
African and Black nationalism in South Africa
Anti-Apartheid organisations
Defunct organizations designated as terrorist in Africa
Defunct organisations based in South Africa
Guerrilla organizations
History of the African National Congress
Military units and formations established in 1961
Military wings of socialist parties
National liberation armies
National liberation movements in Africa
Rebel groups in South Africa
Rebellions in Africa
Resistance movements